William Merric Boyd, known more as Merric Boyd (24 June 1888 – 9 September 1959), was an Australian artist, active as a ceramicist, sculptor, and extensive chronicling of his family and environs in pencil drawing. He held the fine mythic distinction of being the father of Australian studio pottery.

The Boyd family of many generations includes painters, sculptors, architects and other arts professionals, commencing with Boyd's parents Arthur Merric Boyd and Emma Minnie a'Beckett Boyd. Boyd's brothers were Penleigh, a landscape artist, and Martin, a writer. His sister Helen Read, a navy wife, enjoyed taking to painting late in life. He and his wife, Doris, raised noted Australian artists, painters Arthur and David, and sculptor Guy.Their eldest daughter Lucy's ceramic painting benefited greatly from her unique inheritance. Subsequent generations of Boyds are or have enjoyed their rightful approaches in the arts perceived around them.

Background
The second of five children of Arthur Merric Boyd (1862–1940) and Emma Minnie à Beckett (1858–1936), both  established painters, Merric Boyd was born on 24 June 1888 in the Melbourne suburb of St Kilda, in Victoria. Arthur Merric Boyd and family were supported financially by Merric's maternal grandmother Emma à Beckett.  It was Emma's fortune, inherited from her father John Mills, an ex-convict who founded the Melbourne Brewery, that allowed their family to live comfortably. Boyd lived in Sandringham where he was educated at Haileybury College until he was eight. The family moved permanently to the family farm at Yarra Glen and Boyd attended Dookie Agricultural College with aspirations of turning his hand to farming; and then he considered entering the Church of England as a clergyman, spending time studying at St John's Theological College, Melbourne; later Martin Boyd's good available material for his award-winning 1955 novel, A Difficult Young Man.

Career
In 1908 at Archibald McNair's Burnley Pottery, Boyd enjoyed successfully throwing his first pot. Boyd established a studio workshop on his home property at Murrumbeena and pottery kilns were established there in 1911 with the support of his family. He studied under Bernard Hall and Frederick McCubbin at the National Gallery School and where he took up ceramics as a path to sculpture, but settled on pottery as his medium. He held his first exhibition of stoneware, fired in McNair Bros kiln, at the Centreway in Melbourne in 1912 and his second exhibition at Besant Lodge soon afterwards.

In 1915 he married Doris Lucy Eleanor Bloomfield Gough, a fellow student and painter and they settled at Murrumbeena in the house and its surround entitled "Open Country". Before enlisting for WW1, Boyd was employed by Hans Fyansch of the Australian Porcelain Works, Yarraville. Boyd joined the Australian Flying Corps but was discharged later in England before returning to Australia in September 1919.  Before so he undertook six months training in pottery technique at Josiah Wedgwood and Sons, Stoke-on-Trent, and studying in the diploma under Dr. Mellor at Stoke Technical School, and kiln construction under Mr. S. T. Wilson, former President of the English Ceramic Society.

Boyd's best works were produced between 1920 and 1930; mostly pieces for domestic use, often decorated by Doris, and some pottery sculptures. He and Doris often used Australian flora and fauna as decorative motifs, their concession to creating works that would most likely sell well. The Boyd's Murrumbeena pottery was destroyed by fire in 1926. Boyd worked commercially and was able to provide for his family as he and Doris raised painters Arthur and David, and sculptor Guy and their two daughters Lucy and Mary. Mary, the youngest, married artists John Perceval, and later Sidney Nolan.

Subject to epileptic fits and somewhat a recluse in his latter years with a strong interest in Christianity, Merric Boyd died at his home at Murrumbeena on 9 September 1959. His wife, Doris, died within the same dwelling alone nine months later.

See also
Boyd family
Australian art

References

External links
Jug 1933 Ballarat Fine Art Gallery.
(William) Merric Boyd (1888–1959) Gravesite at Brighton General Cemetery (Vic)
Merric Boyd and the Boyd Family at Murrumbeena

Australian ceramicists
1888 births
1959 deaths
Merric
20th-century ceramists
People educated at St John's Theological College, Melbourne
Artists from Melbourne
National Gallery of Victoria Art School alumni